{{Infobox locomotive
| name = Inyo
| powertype = Steam
| gauge = 
| image = VT-22-Inyo-Carson-City-Railroad-Museum.jpg
| caption = The Inyo at the Carson City NSRM branch in 2018.
| whytetype = 4-4-0
| currentowner = Nevada State Railroad Museum
| driverdiameter = 
| locoweight = 
| fueltype = Wood
| boilerpressure = 
| cylindercount = Two, outside
| cylindersize = 
| tractiveeffort = 
| builddate = February 1875
| buildmodel = 8-26 C
| builder = Baldwin Locomotive Works
| officialname = Inyo
| serialnumber = 3693
| operator = Virginia and Truckee Railroad
| fleetnumbers = 22
| firstrundate = 
| retiredate = September 9, 1926
| restoredate = May 29, 1983
| disposition = Operational
{{Designation list
| embed = yes 
| designation1 = NRHP
| designation1_offname = Virginia and Truckee RR. Engines No. 18, The Dayton; and No. 22, The Inyo
| designation1_date = December 18, 1973
| designation1_number = 73002245
}}
}}
Virginia and Truckee Railroad No. 22, also known as the "Inyo", is a 4-4-0 "American" type steam locomotive that was built by the Baldwin Locomotive Works in 1875 and pulled both passenger and freight trains.  The Inyo weighs . Its  driving wheels deliver  of tractive force.  In 1877 it was fitted with air brakes and in 1910 it was converted to burn oil rather than wood.Inyo was retired on September 9, 1926. It was kept in generally working order, to provide a source of spare parts for another V&T locomotive, the Reno.

It was sold to Paramount Pictures in March 1937 for $1,250.  Though not rebuilt by the studio as was the Dayton (another V&T locomotive also purchased by the studio at the time), the engine was repainted and renumbered for use in motion pictures.

In 1969 the locomotive participated in ceremonies for the centennial of the Golden Spike. Inyo was decorated to look like the Central Pacific's Jupiter. It remained at the Golden Spike National Historic Site throughout most of the 1970s. In 1974 the locomotive was sold to the State of Nevada, but it remained in Utah while a brand-new replica locomotive was built to replace it. Inyo finally arrived at the Nevada State Railroad Museum in Carson City in late 1978.

An assessment of the locomotive showed that the Inyo was in good shape, and it was chosen for a full restoration to steam operation. Inyo was completed the next year, debuting on May 29, 1983.

The Inyo remains in Carson City, where it steams up and runs around the museum's track on selected dates, most notably July 4 every year. It was brought to Las Vegas for the month of April 1984 to mark the grand opening of the railroad-themed Palace Station casino.

 Film history 
The Inyo starred in High, Wide, and Handsome in 1937, followed by roles in Union Pacific, Red River and as the Texas and William R. Smith in Disney's The Great Locomotive Chase in 1956. In 1962 she played the Southern Pacific #9 in the John Wayne feature McLintock!. She was featured in the 1960s television series The Wild Wild West'' wearing both the number 8 and 22. In all, the locomotive appeared in over 20 film productions.

References

4-4-0 locomotives
Baldwin locomotives
Individual locomotives of the United States
National Register of Historic Places in Carson City, Nevada
Railway locomotives introduced in 1875
Railway locomotives on the National Register of Historic Places in Nevada
Virginia and Truckee Railroad
Nevada State Register of Historic Places
Standard gauge locomotives of the United States
Preserved steam locomotives of Nevada